Rabbit Without Ears (German title: Keinohrhasen,  "No Ear Rabbits"), is a 2007 German  romantic comedy film, written, produced and directed by Til Schweiger. Co-written by Anika Decker, and starring Nora Tschirner and Schweiger himself, the story of the film revolves around yellow press reporter Ludo and his ex-classmate Anna, who reconvene after years when he is sentenced to 300 hours of community service at her day-care facility.

Produced by Barefoot Films and Warner Bros., the film premiered in theaters across Germany on 20 December 2007, and became a surprise box-office hit, eventually grossing $74,000,000, mostly from its domestic run. By 20 April 2008, Keinohrhasen had reached over six million viewers, ranking it sixth on the list of the most successful German films in Germany since the beginning of the audience census in 1968. Also a critical success, the film was awarded the Goldene Leinwand, a Bogey Award, the Deutscher Comedypreis and a Bambi and received a nomination for the Audience Award at the European Film Awards 2008.

A sequel, entitled Rabbit Without Ears 2, was released on 3 December 2009.

Plot 
Ludo Decker (Schweiger) is a Berlin-based yellow press reporter. With photographer Moritz, his daily routine is to spy on celebrities for the tabloid Das Blatt. He also uses his work for frequent sexual contacts with his objects of interest.

Ludo and Moritz are on scene at the engagement party of heavyweight boxer and celebrity Wladimir Klitschko and Yvonne Catterfeld. As Klitschko raises his glass to toast his fiancée, Ludo breaks through the glass dome roof and tumbles into the cake, to the great consternation of the guests. For this offense he is sentenced to three hundred hours of community service at a local Kindergarten (daycare).

There he encounters Kindergarten director Anna Gotzlowski (Tschirner), who grew up in the same neighborhood as Ludo and frequently endured his pranks and mockery. She exacts revenge for these childhood torments by assigning him to perform humiliating tasks. With his parole at stake, Ludo has no choice but to comply. Nevertheless, he remains interested in one-night stands and has an affair with Nina, mother of Cheyenne Blue, one of the children in his charge.

Eventually tensions between Anna and Ludo dissipate and the two become friends. When Anna's date with another man goes awry, she appears at Ludo's flat seeking comfort. The two of them end up in bed, yet Anna's hopes that this will develop into something more serious are dashed, as Ludo sees her only as a friend. Anna subsequently meets actor Jürgen Vogel in a park and starts dating him. When she accompanies Vogel to the German Film Awards ceremony, Ludo reports that she is the most beautiful woman in attendance, instead of covering female celebrities his editor-in-chief deems more newsworthy. The editor summarily fires him.

Ludo comes to realize that he feels more for Anna than he had previously thought. During a children's festival at a local theatre, he crashes a performance and professes his love for her, as sits in the audience with the children. Having lost his job at the tabloid, he takes a position at the Kindergarten.

Cast 
 Til Schweiger as Ludo Decker, a well-known yellow press reporter and libertine who is sentenced to three hundred hours of community service in a local daycare facility run by his ex-classmate Anna Gotzlowski. Ludo is Latin for "I play". His character was conceptualized as a "comedic tour de force" for Schweiger.
Schweiger created the role of Anna specifically with Tschirner in mind, citing her "one of the best screen actresses in Germany."
 Matthias Schweighöfer as Moritz, a paparazzo and friend of Ludo
 Alwara Höfels as Miriam Steinfeld, a colleague and friend of Anna
 Barbara Rudnik as Lilli Decker, Ludo's elder
 Paul Maximilian Schüller as Lollo, Lilli's
 Emma Schweiger as Cheyenne-Blue, a child at the daycare facility
 Brigitte Zeh as Nina, Cheyenne-Blue's mother
 Lilli Camille Schweiger as Sacha, another child at the daycare facility
 Luna Marie Schweiger as young Anna
 Valentin Florian Schweiger as young Ludo
 Rick Kavanian, as the choleric chief editor of the tabloid Das Blatt
 Jürgen Vogel as himself
 Christian Tramitz as Anna's date
 Wladimir Klitschko as himself
 Yvonne Catterfeld as herself
 Wolfgang Stumph as a taxi driver
 Armin Rohde as Bello
 Fahri Ogün Yardım as Mucki
 Kai Lentrodt as a taxi driver
 Sonsee Neu as a judge
 Pasquale Aleardi as Ludo's attorney
 Paul van Dyk as DJ Paul van Dyk
 Elena Uhlig as a hotel worker
 Gregor Bloéb as Michi Nußbaumer, a folk musician
 Nina Proll as Daniela Berg, Michi's
 Anne-Sophie Briest as Mandy, a headline-making "Ministerluder"

Soundtrack

Music from the Motion Picture album 

Track listing
 "Mr. Brightside" (Jacques Lu Cont's Thin White Duke Mix) (The Killers) – 8:48
 "Deepest Blue" (Deepest Blue) – 3:24
 "Is It Love" (Stefan Hansen, Dirk Reichardt, Mirko Schaffer) – 2:18
 "Anna & Ludo – Hold Me Now" (Rea Garvey) – 1:47
 "Springtimes" (Stefan Hansen, Dirk Reichardt, Mirko Schaffer) – 2:56
 "Lifeline" (Angels & Airwaves) – 4:16
 "Autumn Leaves" (Stefan Hansen, Dirk Reichardt, Mirko Schaffer) – 1:42
 "Everybody's Changing" (Keane) – 3:35
 "Looking for Atlantis" (Prefab Sprout) – 4:03
 "Rain" (Stefan Hansen, Dirk Reichardt, Mirko Schaffer) – 1:18
 "I Still Remember" (Bloc Party) – 4:20
 "Liquid" (Stefan Hansen, Dirk Reichardt, Mirko Schaffer) – 1:43
 "Everything's Magic" (Angels & Airwaves) – 3:51
 "Some Time" (Stefan Hansen, Dirk Reichardt, Mirko Schaffer) – 1:59
 "Sad Song" (Au Revoir Simone) – 4:07
 "Apologize (Timbaland presents OneRepublic) – 3:04
 "A Rainy Day in Vancouver" (Stefan Hansen, Dirk Reichardt, Mirko Schaffer) – 1:38
 "Rocket Brothers" (Kashmir) – 5:27
 "Perfect Circle" (Stefan Hansen, Dirk Reichardt, Mirko Schaffer) – 2:57
 "Cheyenne Blue" (Stefan Hansen, Dirk Reichardt, Mirko Schaffer) – 1:40
 "Der Zauberlehrling" (Junge Dichter & Denker) – 3:54

Charts

Year-end charts

Certifications

The title 
While doing handicraft at the daycare centre, Ludo sews a stuffed rabbit without ears. As Anna criticises him for it, he points at the fact that another rabbit made by the child Cheyenne-Blue has no ears as well. Anna thereupon claims that it is a Keinohrhase, a no-ears rabbit, which is able to hear through its nose. This scene was also used for the first teaser trailer.

A rare earless rabbit born in February 2012 at a zoo in Limbach-Oberfrohna, Saxony was named "Til", in reference to this film's title and its director.  The baby rabbit was accidentally crushed when a television cameraman stepped on him, an event that was briefly the subject of international media coverage.

American remake 
In January 2010, Schweiger sold the rights for the US remake of Keinohrhasen to Newmarket Entertainment; as he stated he hopes to direct the film and to engage Ben Affleck as leading man.

Awards 
 2008: Goldene Leinwand mit Stern for more than 6 million viewers
 2008: Bogey Awards in gold for 3 million viewers within 30 days
 2008: Ernst Lubitsch Prize
 2010: Bronze Palm Award at the Mexico International Film Festival

References

External links 
 
  

German romantic comedy films
2007 films
2000s German-language films
Warner Bros. films
Films set in Berlin
2007 romantic comedy films
Films directed by Til Schweiger
2000s German films